Yevgeny Borisovich Leonov-Gladyshev (born 24 Jan 1952, Vilnius, Lithuanian SSR, USSR) is a Soviet and Russian theater and film actor, and film director. He was awarded Honored Artist of the Russian Federation (1993). and People's Artist of the Russian Federation (2007).

Background
He graduated from the Russian State Institute of Performing Arts (workshop of Vasili Merkuryev and Irina  Meyerhold). His debut came in a teenage film  (1972).

In the film The Meeting Place Cannot Be Changed (1979) Leonov-Gladyshev was offered a trial for one of the main roles, Sharapov. But the artistic council did not approve his candidacy, and the role went to Vladimir Konkin. Instead, director Stanislav Govorukhin offered Yevgeny a small role as an operative Vasya Vekshin.

Since the early 1980s, the actor has worked in remaking foreign films. In 1992 he tried directing. In 1999 he became president of the Guild of film actors of St. Petersburg.

A new round of popularity of the actor came in the police procedural Deadly Force.

References

External links

1952 births
Living people
Male actors from Vilnius
Soviet male film actors
Soviet male television actors
Russian male film actors
Russian male television actors
Honored Artists of the Russian Federation
People's Artists of Russia
Russian film directors
Russian State Institute of Performing Arts alumni